The U.S. state of Florida has a total of 4,510 islands that are ten acres or larger. This is the second-highest number of islands of any state of the United States; only Alaska has more.

Major island chains include the Florida Keys, the Ten Thousand Islands, the Sea Islands, and the barrier islands of the Atlantic coast, the Panhandle Gulf of Mexico coast, and the Tampa Bay Area and Southwest Florida Gulf coast.

See also
 List of island municipalities in Florida

References

 
Florida
Islands